Automobiles J. Suère was a French manufacturer of automobiles between 1909 and 1931.

The business 
The company was started in Paris manufacturing engines branded under the "Velox" name.   Automobiles were added in 1909, and, following the war, continued to be produced in modest volumes till 1931.

The cars 
The first Suères were an 8CV  with an engine capacity of 763cc and a 4-cylinder 10CV of 1592cc bought in from Ballot.

After the war the manufacturer announced an ambitious 1408 cc V8 engined car.  The car sat on a  wheelbase, and appeared at the 15th Paris Motor Show in October 1919 with a 2-seat  "Torpedo" type body and a 17,500 franc manufacturer's price.   Little more was heard of this car, however, and during the early 1920s the manufacturer focused on 4-cylinder models.   At the Motor Show in October 1924 they were exhibiting their 4-cylinder "Type D" with 1843 cc and priced in bare chassis form at 14,100 francs.    "Torpedo" bodied and "Landaulet" versions were also listed, respectively at 20,000 francs and 25,000 francs.

By the time of the 22nd Paris Motor Show in October 1928 Suère were listing three models, all of them powered by side-valve engines, as follows: 
 Suère "8CV" 1.2-litre: wheelbase Prices: 4-seater "Torpédo", 17,000 francs; "Conduite intérieure" (saloon/sedan) 20,000 francs
 Suère "10CV" 1.85-litre: wheelbase Prices: 4-seater "Torpédo", 20,550 francs; "Conduite intérieure" (saloon/sedan) 28,000 francs
 Suère "14CV" 2.4-litre: wheelbase Prices: 7-seater "Torpédo", 20,200 francs

The final offering was the 3200cc straight-eight Model R of 1930, which never progressed beyond the prototype stage.

Reading list 
 Harald Linz, Halwart Schrader: Die Internationale Automobil-Enzyklopädie. United Soft Media Verlag, München 2008, . 
 George Nick Georgano (Chefredakteur): The Beaulieu Encyclopedia of the Automobile. Volume 3: P–Z. Fitzroy Dearborn Publishers, Chicago 2001, . (English)
 George Nick Georgano: Autos. Encyclopédie complète. 1885 à nos jours. Courtille, Paris 1975. (French)

External links 

 Internetseite über Suère (English and Dutch); retrieved, 21 February 2013)

Sources and notes 

Defunct motor vehicle manufacturers of France
Vehicle manufacturing companies established in 1905
1905 establishments in France